The 1843 Connecticut gubernatorial election was held on April 3, 1843. Incumbent governor and Democratic nominee Chauncey Fitch Cleveland was re-elected, defeating former state legislator, Amistad lawyer and Whig nominee Roger Sherman Baldwin with 50.13% of the vote.

General election

Candidates
Major party candidates

Chauncey Fitch Cleveland, Democratic
Roger Sherman Baldwin, Whig

Minor party candidates

Francis Gillette, Liberty

Results

References

1843
Connecticut
Gubernatorial